Yengisar County (also known as Yangi Hissar); via Mandarin Chinese known as Yingjisha (Ying-chi-sha), is a county in the southwest of the Xinjiang Uyghur Autonomous Region. It is under the administration of the Kashgar Prefecture. As of the 2002 census, it had a population of 230,000.

The county seat is the city of Yengisar, a town that is best known among the local Uyghurs for its handmade knives. The finely-tuned skill of knife making used to be passed down among generations in Yengisar, but is slowly dying due to China's strict response to deadly clashes in the Xinjiang region.

History
In 1499, Ahmad Alaq seized Kashgar and Yengisar from Mirza Abu Bakr Dughlat.

In 1847 and again in 1857, Kashgar and Yengisar were captured.

In 1882, Yengisar Zhili Ting was created.

In 1913, Yengisar Zhili Ting became Yengisar County.

The Battle of Yangi Hissar took place here in April 1934, when Ma Zhancang led the Chinese Muslim 36th division to attack the Turkic Muslim Uighur forces at Yangi Hissar, wiping out the entire Uighur force of 500 and killing the Emir Nur Ahmad Jan Bughra.

In 1955, Barin, Jamaterek and Ujme were transferred from Yengisar County to Akto County.

In September 2017, Horigul Nasir, then 21, was jailed for ten years for allegedly promoting the wearing of head scarves. Her brother Yusupjan Nasir was subsequently demoted from his position as an assistant officer of the Saghan township police office to a security guard at the township's Family Planning Department.

Administrative Divisions
, Yengisar County included four towns, ten townships, and two other areas:

Town ( / )
Township ( / )
Sheher Township (Chengguan;  / ), Qolpan Township (Qiaolepan, Cholpan;  / ), Lompa Township (Longfu;  / ), Siyitle Township (Setili;  / 色提力乡), Yengiyer Township (Yingye'er;  / ), Qizil Township (Kezile;  / ), Topluq Township (Tuopuluke;  / ), Soget Township (Sugaiti;  / ), Egus Township (Aigusi;  / ), Egizyer Township (Yigeziye'er;  /  / )
Others
Yengisar County Dongfeng Farm (英吉沙县东风农场), Regiment Dongfeng Farm (兵团东风农场)

Climate

Economy
, there was about 72,700 acres (480,014 mu) of cultivated land in Yengisar.

Demographics

As of 2015, 297,290 of the 302,542 residents of the county were Uyghur, 25,404 were Han Chinese and 851 were from other ethnic groups.

As of 1999, 97.82% of the population of Yengisar (Yingjisha) County was Uyghur and 1.79% of the population was Han Chinese.

Transportation
Yengisar is served by China National Highway 315 and the Southern Xinjiang railway.

Wildlife
The city of Yengisar gave its name to Yangihissar gecko (Cyrtopodion elongatum) lizard species, which occurs throughout eastern Central Asia, including Xinjiang and Gansu Province.

Notable persons
 Isa Alptekin, Uyghur nationalist
 Erkin Alptekin, 1st President of the World Uyghur Congress
 Arken Imirbaki
 Yulbars Khan

Gallery

Notes

References

County-level divisions of Xinjiang
Populated places along the Silk Road
Kashgar Prefecture